Wadd (Ancient South Arabian script: 𐩥𐩵) is a pre-Islamic Arabian god. He was the national god of the Minaeans of South Arabia, and the snake was associated with him. It is also called Waddum and Wadd'ab.

In Islamic tradition, Wadd was worshipped by the Banu Kalb tribe and his idol was located in the city of Dumat al-Jandal. The idol was said to be destroyed by Khalid ibn al-Walid. He is also mentioned in the Quran as a false god of the people of Noah.

Attestations

Pre-Islamic era 
Wadd was the national god of Ma'in, or the Minaeans; the magic formula Wd'b or "Wadd is [my?] father" was written on amulets and buildings. These writings were often accompanied with a symbol; a crescent moon with the small disc of Venus.

An altar dedicated to him was erected by Minaeans living on the Greek island of Delos. The altar contains two inscriptions, one of which is in Minaean language and the other in Greek. Minaean inscription on the altar begins with symbols of three Minaean god one of which is of Wadd whose symbol is a snake. The Minaean text on the altar reads, "Hāni' and Zayd'il [of the lineage] of Hab erected the altar of Wadd and of the deities of Ma'in at Delos." The Greek inscription reads, "[Property] of Oaddos, god of the Minaeans. To Oaddos." He was also worshipped by Minaean colonists in Dedan (modern-day Al-'Ula) during the Lihyanite rule. A temple of Wadd evidently existed in Dedan. There is evidence from Minaean inscriptions of the presence of Levites in the temple of Wadd who according to some scholars were either as priests or cult servants who could later be promoted to higher positions.

Wadd was also the national god of the Awsan kingdom. It is known that in the Hellenistic era, a king of Awsan was proclaimed as "son of (god) Wadd", receiving offerings as if he himself were a god.

Islamic era 
The theophoric name Abd Wadd is attested in the name of Amr ibn Abd Wadd, a champion of the tribe of Quraish who challenged the Muslims for a duel during the Battle of the Trench. Ali, Muhammad's son-in-law and cousin, accepted the challenge and killed Amr.

According to Hisham ibn al-Kalbi's Book of Idols, the Banu Kalb tribe worshipped Wadd in the form of a man and is said to have represented heaven. His idol and temple stood in Dumat al-Jandal, and Malik ibn Harithah, a former devotee of Wadd, describes his idol:
lt was the statue of a huge man, as big as the largest of human beings, covered with two robes, clothed with the one and cloaked with the other, carrying a sword on his waist and a bow on his shoulder, and holding in [one] hand a spear to which was attached a standard, and [in the other] a quiver full of arrows.

He is mentioned in the Qur'an (71:23) as a deity of the time of the Prophet Noah.

And they say: By no means leave your gods, nor leave Wadd, nor Suwa'; nor Yaghuth, and Ya'uq and Nasr. (Qur'an 71:23)
The temple dedicated to Wadd was demolished on the orders of Muhammad in the expedition of Khalid ibn al-Walid (2nd Dumatul Jandal).

See also
 List of lunar deities

Sources
The Book of Idols (Kitab Al-Asnam) by Hisham Ibn Al-Kalbi

References

Arabian gods
Banu Kalb
Lunar gods
South Arabia
Snake gods
National gods